Bring Home the Turkey is a 1927 American short silent comedy film directed by Robert F. McGowan and Anthony Mack. It was the 56th Our Gang short subject released.

Cast

The Gang
 Joe Cobb as Joe
 Jackie Condon as Jackie
 Jean Darling as Jean
 Johnny Downs as Johnny
 Allen Hoskins as Farina
 Jannie Hoskins as Mango
 Mildred Kornman as Mildred
 Scooter Lowry as Skooter
 Jay R. Smith as Jay
 Peggy Eames as Peggy

Additional cast
 Tom Wilson - Uncle Tom
 Louise Emmons - Headmistress
 Lyle Tayo - Judge's servant
 Charley Young - Orphanage official
 Noah Young - The detective
 Dinah the Mule as Herself

See also
 Our Gang filmography

References

External links

1927 films
American silent short films
American black-and-white films
1927 comedy films
Films directed by Robert F. McGowan
Films directed by Robert A. McGowan
Hal Roach Studios short films
1927 short films
Our Gang films
1920s American films
Silent American comedy films